Stockholm, Pennsylvania is a 2015 drama film directed by Nikole Beckwith, as her directorial and film-writing debut. The film premiered at the 2015 Sundance Film Festival. The screenplay was awarded the 2012 Nicholl Fellowship from Academy of Motion Picture Arts and Sciences.

It was produced by Greg Ammon, Leslie Urdang and Dan Halsted with the studio Fido Features. The film was acquired by Lifetime on March 26, 2015, and made its television premiere on May 2, 2015. The film is edited by Joe Klotz.

Plot
Leanne Dargon is kidnapped at age 4 by Ben McKay, who confines her to his basement and renames her Leia. She is reunited with her parents, Marcy and Glen Dargon after 17 years. Suffering from Stockholm syndrome, Leia still sees Ben as her father, and sees two strangers in her biological parents. As time passes, though, Marcy becomes the unstable one, throwing Glen out of the house, locking Leia up and controlling her every action. In the end, Leia escapes the captivity and vows to make a life of her own.

Cast
Saoirse Ronan as Leia Dargon
Hana Hayes as Leia, aged 12
Cynthia Nixon as Marcy Dargon
David Warshofsky as Glen Dargon
Jason Isaacs as Ben McKay
Rosalind Chao as Dr. Andrews

Reception
The film received mixed reviews, with critics comparing the second half unfavorably with the first. Rodrigo Perez from IndieWire wrote in his review that "the tone-deaf misjudgment of the film’s second half is catastrophic; a bafflingly ill-advised blunder that Stockholm, Pennsylvania never recovers from".

On review aggregator Rotten Tomatoes, 27% of 11 reviews are positive, and the average rating is 4.6/10. On Metacritic, the film has a weighted average score of 47 out of 100, based on reviews from 5 critics, indicating "mixed or average reviews".

At the 20th Satellite Awards, the film won the award for Best Television Film.

References

External links

Stockholm, Pennsylvania at Rotten Tomatoes

2015 films
2015 drama films
2015 directorial debut films
2015 independent films
American drama films
Films about kidnapping
2010s English-language films
2010s American films